Pavlo Riabikin (born 6 June 1965) is a Ukrainian statesman, politician and diplomat. He was from November 2021 to March 2023 the Minister of Strategic Industries of Ukraine. Riabikin was Head of the State Customs Service of Ukraine from November 2020 to November 2021. Riabikin was elected to the Verkhovna Rada (Ukraine's national parliament) in 2012. Member of the Parliamentary Assembly of the Council of Europe (since 2012).

Biography 

He graduated from Taras Shevchenko National University of Kyiv with a degree in “Jurisprudence”, obtained the qualification of “International Lawyer”, a translator-referent of the German language. Internship: Leipzig University (1987), Kiel University (2000).

In 2000–2005, he was a People's Deputy of Ukraine, worked in the Committee of the Verkhovna Rada of Ukraine on Legal Policy, and since 2002 – Chairman of the Subcommittee on Economic Issues of the Legislation Committee of the Verkhovna Rada of Ukraine on Economic Policy, Management of the National Economy, Property and Investments.

From July 2005 to August 2006, he was a Deputy Minister of Transport and Communications of Ukraine.

From September 2006 to July 2009, from June 2010 to November 2012 and from October 2015 to March 2017, he was the deputy director, chief of the port of the Recreation and Health Center “Green Port”.

From August 2009 to June 2010 — Ambassador Extraordinary and Plenipotentiary of Ukraine to the Kingdom of Denmark, Ministry of Foreign Affairs of Ukraine. Diplomatic rank — Envoy Extraordinary and Plenipotentiary of the 2nd class (since February 2010).

In 2012, Riabikin was elected to the Verkhovna Rada. From December 2012 to November 2014, he worked in the Committee on Transport and Communications of the Verkhovna Rada of Ukraine.

From July 2014 to September 2015 he was a deputy head of the Kyiv City State Administration.

From March 2017 to November 2020, he managed the work of the state enterprise
Boryspil International Airport in the position of CEO.

From November 2020 to November 2021, he was the Head of the State Customs Service of Ukraine.

On 21 July 2019, he was elected a People's Deputy of Ukraine.

On 29 August 2019, he was elected Chairman of the Committee of the Verkhovna Rada of Ukraine on Agrarian and Land Policy in the 9th Ukrainian Verkhovna Rada.

On 4 November 2021, Pavlo Riabikin was appointed as the Minister of Strategic Industries of Ukraine. Parliament dismissed him from this position on 20 March 2023.

See also 
 Shmyhal Government

References

External links 

 Ministry of Strategic Industries of Ukraine (in Ukrainian)

1965 births
Living people
Politicians from Kyiv
Diplomats from Kyiv
Taras Shevchenko National University of Kyiv, Institute of International Relations alumni
Third convocation members of the Verkhovna Rada
Fourth convocation members of the Verkhovna Rada
Seventh convocation members of the Verkhovna Rada
Our Ukraine (political party) politicians
Ukrainian Democratic Alliance for Reform politicians
Government ministers of Ukraine
Ambassadors of Ukraine to Denmark
21st-century Ukrainian politicians